Cheshmeh Kazem (also Romanized as Cheshmeh-e Kāz̧em, Cheshmeh Kāz̧em, Chashmeh-ye Kāz̄ām, and Cheshmeh-ye Kāz̧em; also known as Chashmeh Kāzim and Cheshmeh Kāz̧emīyeh) is a village in Howmeh Rural District, in the Central District of Bijar County, Kurdistan Province, Iran. At the 2006 census, its population was 93, in 25 families. The village is populated by Kurds.

References 

Towns and villages in Bijar County
Kurdish settlements in Kurdistan Province